The University of Basilicata, colloquially known as Unibas, is an Italian public research university located in Potenza, with a satellite campus in Matera. It was founded in 1982 and is organized in six faculties (two schools and four departments). It has also one school of specialization and five doctoral schools.

Organization
The university consists of two schools and four departments:

 School of Engineering
 School of Agricultural science, Forestry, Food and Environmental sciences
 Department of Humanities
 Department of European and Mediterranean Cultures
 Department of Mathematics, Information Technology and Economics
 Department of Natural sciences

Furthermore, the university has one school of specialization and five doctoral schools:

 School of specialization in Archaeology
 Doctoral school in Applied Biology and Environmental Safeguard
 Doctoral school in Cities and Landscapes: Architecture, Archaeology, Cultural Heritage, History and Resources
 Doctoral school in Engineering for Innovation and Sustainable Development
 Doctoral school in Agricultural, Forest and Food Sciences
 Doctoral school in History, Cultures and Knowledge of the Mediterranean Europe from the Antiquity to the Contemporary Age

See also
 List of Italian universities

References

External links
University of Basilicata – official website
University of Basilicata Socrates Programme

Universities in Italy
University of Basilicata
Educational institutions established in 1982
1982 establishments in Italy
Buildings and structures in Basilicata